Luminescent is the fourth and final studio album by British indie and electronic band The Sunshine Underground released 30 September 2016.

Track listing

 Rise – 5:39
 Something's Gonna Happen – 3:38
 Sunbeam – 5:08
 Today – 4:03
 Luminescent – 4:28
 Open Up – 3:46
 Shimmer – 4:21
 Skyline – 4:18
 Radiator – 6:27

2016 albums
The Sunshine Underground albums